Jiraporn Mongkoldee (born 13 August 1998) is a Thai footballer who plays as a midfielder for the Thailand women's national team.

International goals

References

1998 births
Living people
Women's association football midfielders
Jiraporn Mongkoldee
Jiraporn Mongkoldee
Jiraporn Mongkoldee
Jiraporn Mongkoldee